Daldy is a British surname, now more common in Australia and New Zealand. It may refer to:

Alfred Daldy (1865–1935), British archdeacon
Amey Daldy (1829–1920), New Zealand suffragist
Vicki Daldy (born 1966), Australian basketball player
William Daldy (1816–1903), New Zealand politician

See also
Dalby (disambiguation)
William C Daldy, a steam engine tugboat operating in New Zealand